Abei Township, also Abeixiang  is a township-level division situated in the Jixi prefecture of Heilongjiang, China. Established in 1979 under the jurisdiction of Hulin City, it has an area of almost 300 square kilometers and more than 11.2 million mu of arable land. It contains Xinancha Reservoir, which lies east of the main village towards Xiaomuhe.

Administrative divisions
The township-level division contains the following villages:

Xinfu Village 	
Xinlu Village 	
Xinzhong Village 	
Abei Village 	
Adong Village 	
Xinlin Village 	
Xinzheng Village

See also
List of township-level divisions of Heilongjiang

References

Township-level divisions of Heilongjiang